Timothy James Hyers (born October 3, 1971) is an American former professional baseball first baseman and current hitting coach for the Texas Rangers of Major League Baseball (MLB). He played in MLB  for the San Diego Padres, Detroit Tigers, and Florida Marlins. He has also served as the hitting coach for the Los Angeles Dodgers and Boston Red Sox.

Playing career
Hyers attended Newton County High School in Georgia and was selected in the second round by the Toronto Blue Jays in the 1990 Major League Baseball Draft.

During his ten-year (1990–99) minor league career in the Blue Jays, Padres, Arizona Diamondbacks and Marlins organizations, he batted .261 with 847 hits.

He batted .217 with two home runs at 17 runs batted in in 133 games played during his MLB career.

Post-playing career
After retiring from the playing ranks, Hyers worked as a hitting coach in the Tigers' farm system, and also taught physical education at Victory Christian School in Conyers, Georgia. He then was an area scout for the Boston Red Sox in Georgia during 2009–2012. In 2013, Hyers was appointed the Red Sox' minor league hitting coordinator and served three seasons in that post.  During the 2014 season, he served as interim hitting coach for the Red Sox, while Greg Colbrunn was recovering from a cerebral hemorrhage.

Hyers returned to MLB full-time when he was named assistant hitting coach of the Los Angeles Dodgers for the 2016 season, serving under new manager Dave Roberts. Hyers was a member of Roberts' staff through the 2017 season. On November 4, 2017, Hyers was named hitting coach of the Boston Red Sox on the staff of new manager Alex Cora. Hyers served as hitting coach for the Red Sox through the 2021 season, including the team's 2018 championship. On November 1, 2021, Hyers declined the team's offer to return for the 2022 season. On November 10, 2021, he was named the hitting coach of the Texas Rangers.

References

External links

1971 births
Living people
American expatriate baseball players in Canada
Baseball coaches from Georgia (U.S. state)
Baseball players from Georgia (U.S. state)
Boston Red Sox coaches
Boston Red Sox scouts
Calgary Cannons players
Charlotte Knights players
Detroit Tigers players
Dunedin Blue Jays players
Florida Marlins players
Knoxville Smokies players
Las Vegas Stars (baseball) players
Los Angeles Dodgers coaches
Major League Baseball first basemen
Major League Baseball hitting coaches
Medicine Hat Blue Jays players
Minor league baseball coaches
Myrtle Beach Hurricanes players
San Diego Padres players
Texas Rangers coaches
Toledo Mud Hens players
Tucson Sidewinders players